Dante Gavrilita (Como, 25 October 1997) is an Italian rugby union player.
His usual position is as a Prop and he currently plays for Calvisano in Top12.

In 2017, Gavrilita was named in the Italy Under 20 squad.

References 

It's Rugby England Profile
Ultimate Rugby Profile
ESPN Profile

1997 births
Living people
Sportspeople from Como
Italian rugby union players
Rugby union props